Čížečku, čížečku ("Siskin, o Little Siskin") is a traditional Czech children's folk song and a singing game which was performed in the past as an annual custom supposed to enhance the yield of poppy.

The song is a chain of verses of the same pattern of call and response:
Call:
Siskin, o little Siskin, a little birdie,
Tell me o Siskin how the poppy is sown

Response:
This is how the poppies are sowed (repeated, with variations)

In Czech:
 Čížečku, čížečku, ptáčku maličký,
pověz mi čížečku, jak sejou mák?
Aj tak, tak sejou mák, aj tak, tak sejou mák,
aj tak, tak sejou mák, tak sejou mák.

The call/response is repeated, with the verb "sowed"  being replaced with the other stages of growing, harvesting and processing the poppies:
Grows
Blossoms
Harvested
Is milled (or "crushed")
Is eaten 

With every response the children are supposed to perform an action of how exactly the poppy is sown, grown, eaten, etc. It may also be arranged in the form of a dance.

See also
Chizhik-Pyzhik

References

External links
Čížečku, čížečku , a Czech TV webpage (with video)

Singing games
Czech folk songs
Czech-language songs
Czech children's songs
Traditional children's songs
Pantomime
Songs about birds
Songs about plants